A shore-based test facility (SBTF), also known as a land-based test facility, is used for the flight testing of aircraft that operate from aircraft carriers. They are also used for the training of the pilots who will operate the aircraft from the aircraft carriers. Only four countries in the world have SBTF or LBTF; they are China, India, Ukraine / Russia and the United States.

China
China's People's Liberation Army Navy has two test centers, one at Wuhan and one at Huludao.

India

The Indian Navy's SBTF is located at INS Hansa in Goa, and is used to train and certify navy pilots of the Mikoyan MiG-29K for the aircraft carrier INS Vikramaditya, and for the developmental trials of the naval HAL Tejas. This SBTF was designed by Nevskoye Design Bureau (NDB) of Russia for Aeronautical Development Agency (ADA). The ski-jump resembles part of a parabola and has an inclination of 14 degrees. The highest point of the ski-jump is at 5.71 metres from the ground.

Ukraine/Russia
The Ukrainian Navy inherited a former Soviet Naval Aviation base at Novofedorivka. This base now hosts the Nitka Naval Pilot Training Center, which is used by the Russian Navy to train their carrier pilots. This base, being in Crimea, is now in Russian control.

United States

The United States Navy has been testing the new Electromagnetic Aircraft Launch System from the land based launch facility at Joint Base McGuire-Dix-Lakehurst.

References

Naval aviation services
Indian Navy
People's Liberation Army Navy
Ukraine Navy facilities
United States Navy